Raymond Meredith Belbin (born 4 June 1926) is a British researcher and management consultant best known for his work on management teams. He is a visiting professor and Honorary Fellow of Henley Management College in Oxfordshire, England.

Early life and work
Belbin took both his first and second degrees, Classics and then Psychology, at Clare College, Cambridge. His first appointment after his doctorate was as a research fellow at Cranfield College (now Cranfield School of Management at Cranfield University). His early research focused mainly on older workers in industry. He returned to Cambridge and joined the Industrial Training Research Unit (ITRU) where his wife Eunice was director and he subsequently became chairman. Belbin combined this job with acting as OECD consultant running successful demonstration projects in Sweden, Austria, UK and the United States.

It was while at ITRU, in the late 1960s, that Belbin was invited to carry out research at what was then called the Administrative Staff College at Henley-on-Thames. The work which formed the basis of his 1981 classic took several years and, after publication, it was some time before its real importance was recognised. For instance, the Apollo Syndrome was later derived from his classic book. 

Belbin and his son Nigel established BELBIN Associates in 1988 to publish and promote the research.

Belbin believes the European Union is "a minuscule bureaucracy, with no forces to exercise control at all."

Belbin's research

Belbin's 1981 book Management Teams presented conclusions from his work studying how members of teams interacted during business games run at Henley Management College.  Amongst his key conclusions was the proposition that an effective team has members that cover eight (later nine) key roles in managing the team and how it carries out its work.  This may be separate from the role each team member has in carrying out the work of the team.

Based on Belbin's model of nine team roles, managers or organisations building working teams would be advised to ensure that each of the roles can be performed by a team member.  Some roles are compatible and can be more easily fulfilled by the same person; some are less compatible and are likely to be done well by people with different behavioural clusters. This means that a team need not be as many as nine people, but perhaps should be at least three or four. While comparisons can be drawn between Belbin's behavioural team roles and personality types, the roles represent tasks and functions in the self-management of the team's activities. Tests exist to identify ideal team roles, but this does not preclude an extravert from being a Completer Finisher, nor an introvert from being a Resource Investigator.

References

1926 births
Living people
Alumni of Clare College, Cambridge
Alumni of Cranfield University
British management consultants